Abner Charles Powell (December 15, 1860 – August 7, 1953) was a Major League Baseball player who was a member of the Washington Nationals of the Union Association in 1884. 

He later played for the Baltimore Orioles and the Cincinnati Red Stockings in 1886. He also managed and owned several teams, and is best known for his innovations as a manager.

Personal life
Powell was born in Shenandoah, Pennsylvania He died in New Orleans, aged 92.

Innovations
 Powell is credited with various innovations that changed baseball, though in many cases this is incorrect or overstated.
He is incorrectly credited with inventing rain checks and "ladies' day," but both of these were in use in New Orleans before Powell. Powell did improve the existing rain check system, however, by adding a perforated stub to tickets when sold so that only purchasers of tickets (and not other spectators, notably free-riders and fence-climbers) could get new tickets.

The idea of Ladies Day was to create an environment in the stands that would be free of unsavory characters and conduct, as well as to make baseball a family-oriented event; it dates at least to 1880 in New Orleans. Powell scheduled a recurring Ladies Day in 1887.

Powell is also credited with using an infield tarpaulin so that fields could be ready immediately after rain storms.

References

External links

 

1860 births
1953 deaths
Washington Nationals (UA) players
Baltimore Orioles (AA) players
Cincinnati Red Stockings (AA) players
Major League Baseball outfielders
19th-century baseball players
Major League Baseball pitchers
Major League Baseball right fielders
Baseball players from Pennsylvania
Atlanta Crackers managers
Minor league baseball managers
Peoria Reds players
Washington Nationals (minor league) players
New Orleans Pelicans (baseball) players
New Orleans (minor league baseball) players
Hamilton Hams players
Montreal (minor league baseball) players
Spokane (minor league baseball) players
Seattle (minor league baseball) players
Seattle Hustlers players
Nashville Tigers players
Wilkes-Barre Coal Barons players
New Castle Quakers players
Newark Colts players
Paterson Giants players
People from Shenandoah, Pennsylvania